Alhaji Attahiru Dalhatu Bafarawa (born 4 November 1954) is a Nigerian politician who was the executive governor of Sokoto State in Nigeria from 29 May 1999 to 29 May 2007.

Early career
He was a local government councillor in charge of Education. In 1979, he ran unsuccessfully for election to the House of Representatives on the platform of the Great Nigeria Peoples Party (GNPP). 
He was a member of the National Constitutional Conference of 1994–1995, during the military rule of Sani Abacha.
He was a founding member of the United Nigeria Congress Party (UNCP – 1997) and the All People's Party (APP – 1998).

Governor of Sokoto State
In 1999 he was elected governor of Sokoto State on the platform of the All Nigeria Peoples Party (ANPP), and was re-elected for the ANPP in 2003. 
In March 2002, a Sharia court in Sokoto State freed a 35-year-old woman Safiya Hussaini, who had been sentenced to death by stoning after being found guilty of adultery. Nigeria's justice minister declared Sharia unconstitutional. Attahiru Bafarawa, however, said the Sharia states would not adhere to this declaration.

Under the Bafarawa administration the state made significant improvements in the quality of roads. Schools were upgraded, and enrolment greatly improved due to assurances that all pupils would be taught morals and Islamic religion. The government built over 70 mosques. The water supply was improved through construction of boreholes.

Later career

Attahiru Bafarawa founded the Democratic People's Party (DPP) and became its presidential candidate at the 2007 presidential elections in Nigeria.
As presidential candidate, while meeting with officials of the US State Department in Washington, D.C., he promised to scrap the Niger Delta Development Commission (NDDC) if elected, describing the commission as "a conduit of corruption and waste."

References

1954 births
Living people
Nigerian Muslims
Governors of Sokoto State
Great Nigeria People's Party politicians
United Nigeria Congress Party politicians
All People's Party (Nigeria) politicians
All Nigeria Peoples Party politicians
Democratic People's Party (Nigeria) politicians
Candidates for President of Nigeria
Candidates in the Nigerian general election, 2007